The Best Thing for You is an album by trumpeter Chet Baker which was recorded in 1977 but not released on the A&M label until 1989, after the performer's death. The tracks were rereleased as part of the double CD reissue of You Can't Go Home Again in 2000 with previously unreleased tracks and alternate takes.

Reception 

The Allmusic review by Scott Yanow states "This CD features previously unissued material from the same sessions that resulted in You Can't Go Home Again and, if anything, the music is a touch better. ... Throughout, Chet Baker shows that his playing during his much documented final period would be equal if not superior to his more acclaimed recordings of the 1950s".

Track listing 
 "The Best Thing for You" (Irving Berlin) – 4:20 
 "I'm Getting Sentimental Over You/You've Changed" (George Bassman, Ned Washington/ Bill Carey, Carl Fischer) – 6:05 
 "Oh, You Crazy Moon" (Jimmy Van Heusen, Johnny Burke) – 3:38 
 "How Deep Is the Ocean?" (Berlin) – 5:49 
 "If You Could See Me Now" (Tadd Dameron, Carl Sigman) – 4:43 
 "El Morro" (Sebesky) – 17:13

Personnel 
Chet Baker – trumpet
Paul Desmond – alto saxophone
Ron Carter – bass
Kenny Barron – piano
Tony Williams – drums
John Scofield – electric and acoustic guitar (track 6)
Richie Beirach – electric piano (track 6)
Hubert Laws – flute (track 6)
Michael Brecker – tenor saxophone (track 6)
Arto Tuncboyaciyan – percussion, voice (track 6)
Gene Bertoncini – acoustic guitar (track 5)

References 

Chet Baker albums
1989 albums
A&M Records albums